Samuel Wallis (23 April 1728 – 21 January 1795 in London) was a British naval officer and explorer of the Pacific Ocean who made the first recorded visit by a European navigator to Tahiti.

Biography
Wallis was born at Fenteroon Farm, near Camelford, Cornwall. As was reported in the press, he was also tasked with discovering the Southern Continent. The two ships were parted by a storm shortly after sailing through the Strait of Magellan. In June 1767, the expedition made the first European landfall on Tahiti, which he named "King George the Third's Island" in honour of the King. Wallis himself was ill and remained in his cabin so lieutenant Tobias Furneaux was the first to set foot, hoisting a pennant and turning a turf, taking possession in the name of His Majesty. He described Tahiti as having a very good climate and the island being 'one of the most healthy as well as delightful spots in the world'.

Dolphin stayed in Matavai Bay in Tahiti for over a month. Wallis went on to name or rename five more islands in the Society Islands and six atolls in the Tuamotu Islands, as well as confirming the locations of Rongerik and Rongelap in the Marshall Islands. He renamed the Polynesian island of Uvea as Wallis after himself, before reaching Tinian in the Mariana Islands. He continued to Batavia, where many of the crew died from dysentery, then via the Cape of Good Hope to England, arriving in May 1768.

Following his return in England, Wallis was able to pass on useful information to James Cook, who was due to depart shortly for the Pacific, and some of the crew from the Dolphin sailed with Cook. Although Cook carried an official report of Wallis's circumnavigation, it is not known whether the two met prior to Cook's departure in August 1768.

In 1780 Wallis was appointed an Extra Commissioner of the Navy.

See also

 European and American voyages of scientific exploration

Notes

References
 Glyndwr Williams, 'Wallis, Samuel (1728–1795)', Oxford Dictionary of National Biography, Oxford University Press, 2004; online edn, May 2005  accessed 10 Dec 2007

, Volume I, Volume II-III

External links

 South Seas Companion Biographical entry
 Biographical references. Royal Geographical Society of South Australia

1728 births
1795 deaths
Royal Navy officers
Circumnavigators of the globe
British explorers of the Pacific
People from Camelford
Explorers from Cornwall
18th-century explorers
History of Wallis and Futuna
Sailors from Cornwall
Military personnel from Cornwall
Royal Navy personnel of the Seven Years' War
Royal Navy personnel of the American Revolutionary War